The 1987–88 Scottish Inter-District Championship was a rugby union competition for Scotland's district teams.

This season saw the 35th formal Scottish Inter-District Championship.

History

Edinburgh District won the competition with four wins.

South of Scotland District won the sponsor McEwans tankards for scoring the most number of tries in the championship, with 17 tries. The others scored:- Anglo-Scots (11 tries), Edinburgh District (9 tries), Glasgow District (6 tries) and North and Midlands (5 tries).

1987-88 League Table

Results

Round 1

Anglo-Scots: 

South of Scotland District: 

Glasgow District: 

Edinburgh District:

Round 2

North and Midlands: 

Anglo-Scots: 

South of Scotland District: 

Glasgow District:

Round 3

Edinburgh District: 

North and Midlands: 

Glasgow District: 

Anglo-Scots:

Round 4

Anglo-Scots: 

Edinburgh District: 

South of Scotland District: 

North and Midlands:

Round 5

North and Midlands: 

Glasgow District: 

Edinburgh District: 

South of Scotland District:

Matches outwith the Championship

Other Scottish matches

Glasgow trial: 

-: 

Midland Trial: 

-:

Junior matches

Glasgow: 

Ulster Juniors: 

South: 

Glasgow: 

Edinburgh: 

Midlands District: 

Glasgow District: 

Midlands District: 

Edinburgh District: 

South of Scotland District:

Trial matches

Blues: 

Reds:

English matches

Harlequins: 

Glasgow District: 

Kent: 

Glasgow District:

Irish matches

Blackrock College: 

North and Midlands: 

Terenure College: 

North and Midlands: 

Edinburgh District: 

Leinster: 

South of Scotland: 

Leinster:

International matches

Glasgow District: 

France: 

Anglo-Scots: 

France: 

Edinburgh District: 

France:

References

1987–88 in Scottish rugby union
1987-88
Scot